Franklin for Short is an indie band from Ventura, California that touts a folky-beach sound. Current members include Seth Pettersen, Trevor Beld-Jimenez, Bryan Russell, Brian Granillo, and Matt Barks. They have been supporting acts for artists such as Kings of Convenience, The Mother Hips, and Sherwood. Franklin for Short has released seven albums in their six-year existence and are currently signed to Beehouse Records. Trevor Beld-Jimenez is also the singer and songwriter of Tall Tales and the Silver Lining. Seth Pettersen also has a musical side project known as Seth Pettersen and The Undertow.  Franklin for Short has been on hiatus since 2010.

History 
Franklin for Short was started by Seth Pettersen and Trevor Beld, who had been playing music together since the 1990s. Pettersen wrote a demo of 12 songs, which featured Beld on bass. The band emerged from the coffee shop scene, eventually forming into a quintet.

Discography 

 Wildcat (2002)
 Lovesick Mistress (2004)
 In the Dark (2004)
 The Gift Curse (2005)
 Swell (2008)
 Dark Cloud (2010)

Members 
 Seth Pettersen - vocals, guitar
 Trevor Beld-Jimenez - bass, vocals
 Bryan Russell - guitar
 Brian Granillo - drums
 Matt Barks - keys

Past members 
 Hot Carl- guitar, noise, sonic youth sounds
 Victor Fuentes (Daisy Fuentes Cousin) Drums, punk rock from the 805

References

External links 
 Franklin for Short's Blog
 Beehouse Records -- Franklin for Short
 Facebook
 MySpace
 

Indie rock musical groups from California
Musical groups from Ventura County, California